{{DISPLAYTITLE:C2H7N}}
The molecular formula C2H7N (molar mass: 45.07 g/mol, exact mass: 45.0579 u) may refer to:

 Ethylamine (ethanamine)
 Dimethylamine (N,N-dimethylamine)